Li Duan (born 1978) is a blind Chinese Paralympic athlete competing mainly in F11 jumping events. He became blind after an explosion on 11 September 1996. Before that he was a professional basketball player who played for the Chinese Basketball Association team Shenyang Army during the 1995–96 CBA season.

He competed in the 2000 Summer Paralympics in Sydney, Australia. There he won a silver medal in the men's Triple jump F11 event, a bronze medal in the men's Long jump F11 event and finished seventh in the men's Javelin throw F11 event.  He also competed at the 2004 Summer Paralympics in Athens, Greece.  There he won a gold medal in the men's Triple jump F11 event, a gold medal in the men's Long jump F11 event and finished fourth in the men's Javelin throw F11 event.  At the 2008 Summer Paralympics in Beijing, China, he won gold medals in the men's Long jump F11 and Triple jump F11 events. He broke the Triple Jump F11 world record in the process. At the 2012 Summer Paralympics he won silver in the Triple jump and bronze in the Long jump.

Li Duan has become known for his showmanship, arriving on the runway still in tracksuit pants, then stripping down to his shorts with a flourish just before commencing a jump. 

Li Duan was the final torchbearer of the 2022 Winter Paralympics in Beijing, and lit the flame during the opening ceremonies.

References

External links
 

Paralympic athletes of China
Athletes (track and field) at the 2000 Summer Paralympics
Athletes (track and field) at the 2004 Summer Paralympics
Athletes (track and field) at the 2008 Summer Paralympics
Athletes (track and field) at the 2012 Summer Paralympics
Paralympic gold medalists for China
Paralympic silver medalists for China
Paralympic bronze medalists for China
Chinese male long jumpers
Chinese male triple jumpers
1978 births
Living people
Athletes from Jilin
World record holders in Paralympic athletics
Medalists at the 2000 Summer Paralympics
Medalists at the 2004 Summer Paralympics
Medalists at the 2008 Summer Paralympics
Medalists at the 2012 Summer Paralympics
Basketball players from Changchun
Paralympic medalists in athletics (track and field)
Visually impaired long jumpers
Visually impaired triple jumpers
Paralympic long jumpers
Paralympic triple jumpers
21st-century Chinese people
Medalists at the 2010 Asian Para Games